Babych is a surname. Notable people with the surname include:

 Dave Babych (born 1961), Canadian ice hockey player
 Nadiya Babych (1943–2021), Ukrainian linguist
 Oleksandr Babych (born 1979), Ukrainian footballer
 Wayne Babych (born 1958), Canadian ice hockey player

See also
 Babich